Kim Dong-gil (2 October 1928 – 4 October 2022) was a South Korean poet and politician. A member of the Unification National Party and later the United Liberal Democrats, he served in the National Assembly from 1992 to 1996.

Kim died in Seodaemun District on 4 October 2022, at the age of 94 from post COVID-19 complications.

References

1928 births
2022 deaths
South Korean poets
Members of the National Assembly (South Korea)
United Liberal Democrats politicians
Yonsei University alumni
Academic staff of Yonsei University
Academic staff of Korea University
Academic staff of Myongji University
Academic staff of Dankook University
Boston University alumni
Indiana University alumni
People from South Pyongan
Deaths from the COVID-19 pandemic in South Korea